Edward Fitzsimmons (1869 – 28 January 1942), was a New Zealand cricketer who played first-class cricket for Wellington from 1890 to 1896.

Fitzsimmons was an off-spin bowler. In 1890–91, on the first day of his second first-class match, against Canterbury, 31 wickets fell for 242 runs as he helped dismiss Canterbury twice with 4 for 8 and 2 for 25; Wellington won by eight wickets early on the second day. He took his best figures of 5 for 39 (9 for 66 in the match) in Wellington's victory over Hawke's Bay two seasons later.

He worked as a telegraphist with the Post and Telegraph Department.

References

External links
 
 Edward Fitzsimmons at CricketArchive

1869 births
1942 deaths
Wellington cricketers
New Zealand cricketers